Three-time defending champions Yui Kamiji and Jordanne Whiley defeated Marjolein Buis and Diede de Groot in the final, 2–6, 6–3, 6–0 to win the ladies' doubles wheelchair tennis title at the 2017 Wimbledon Championships.

Seeds

  Jiske Griffioen /  Aniek van Koot (Griffioen withdrew and was replaced by Dana Mathewson) (semifinals)
  Marjolein Buis /  Diede de Groot (final)

Draw

Finals

References
WC Women's Doubles

Women's Wheelchair Doubles
Wimbledon Championship by year – Wheelchair women's doubles